Euphemia is a Greek female given name, meaning "well-spoken". It is derived from the ancient Greek words ευ (good) and φημί (to speak). Its diminutive or pet form is Effie or Phemie.

Euphemia, also rendered as Eufemia and Eupham, may also refer to:

People

Saints
 Euphemia (died 303 CE) - Christian martyr and saint

Royalty
 Euphemia (empress) (died 520s), Byzantine Empress
 Euphemia of Hungary (died 1111), Duchess Consort of Moravia
 Euphemia of Kiev (died 1139), Queen Consort of Hungary
 Euphemia of Rügen (c. 1280–1312), Queen Consort of Norway
 Euphemia de Ross (died 1386), Queen Consort of Scotland
 Euphemia of Sweden (1317–1370), Duchess Consort of Mecklenburg
 Euphemia of Pomerania (1285–1330), Queen Consort of Denmark

Nobles
 Euphemia of Greater Poland (c. 1230–after 1281) - wife of Władysław Opolski
 Euphemia I, Countess of Ross (died in the 1390s)
 Euphemia II, Countess of Ross (fl. early 15th century)

Other people
 Euphemia Cowan Barnett (1890–1970), Scottish botanist
 Euphemia Vale Blake (1817–1904), American author, critic
 Euphemia Bostock (born 1936, aka Phemie Bostock), Aboriginal Australian artist, involved with the National Black Theatre in Sydney in the 1970s
 Effie Gray (1828–1897), wife of first art critic John Ruskin, then painter John Everett Millais
 Euphemia Wilson Pitblado (1849–1928), Scottish-born American activist, social reformer
 Eufemia "Femi" Benussi (born 1945), Italian actress
 Emilia Euphemia Clarke (born 1986), British actress

As a surname
 Catarina Eufémia (1928–1954), Portuguese peasant who became a symbol of Portuguese communists
 Frank Eufemia (born 1959), retired Major League Baseball relief pitcher

Fictional characters
 Euphemia li Britannia, in the anime series Code Geass
 Effie Munro, in the Sherlock Holmes story "The Adventure of the Yellow Face"
 Effie is the name of detective Sam Spade's secretary in The Maltese Falcon 
 Effie Trinket, in the saga The Hunger Games

Other uses
 , a United States Navy patrol boat in commission from 1917 to 1919
 630 Euphemia, a minor planet
 Euphemia (typeface), included in OS X
 "Euphemia", song by Area 11 from the albums Blackline and All the Lights in the Sky
 Gulf of Saint Euphemia, an Italian gulf

See also
Santa Eufemia (disambiguation) for a list of geographic locations named after Euphemia

Feminine given names